| top goal scorer     =  Sebastián Driussi Maximiliano Moralez(3 goals each)
| prevseason          = 2021
| nextseason          = 2023
}}

The 2022 MLS Cup Playoffs (branded as the Audi 2022 MLS Cup Playoffs for sponsorship reasons) was the 27th edition of the MLS Cup Playoffs, the post-season championship of Major League Soccer (MLS), the top soccer league in the United States and Canada. The tournament culminated the 2022 MLS regular season. The tournament began on October 15 and concluded with MLS Cup 2022 on November 5, 16 days before the start of the 2022 FIFA World Cup in Qatar.

New York City FC entered the playoffs as the defending MLS champions, but were eliminated in the conference finals by the Philadelphia Union. Los Angeles FC entered as Supporters' Shield winners and won their first MLS Cup, defeating the Philadelphia Union in a penalty shoot-out. The 2022 playoffs marks the first since 2008 where no teams from the Pacific Northwest region (including 2021 finalist Portland Timbers) qualified. Austin FC and FC Cincinnati reached the MLS Cup Playoffs for the first time in 2022.

Qualified teams 

Eastern Conference
CF Montréal
FC Cincinnati
Inter Miami CF
New York City FC
New York Red Bulls
Orlando City SC
Philadelphia Union

Western Conference
Austin FC
FC Dallas
Los Angeles FC
LA Galaxy
Nashville SC
Minnesota United FC
Real Salt Lake

Conference standings
The top seven teams in the Eastern and Western Conference qualified for the MLS Cup Playoffs, with the conference champions receiving first round byes. A green background denotes teams that qualified for the 2023 CONCACAF Champions League.

Eastern Conference

Western Conference

Bracket

Note: The higher seeded teams hosted matches, with the MLS Cup host determined by overall points.

First round
The second through fourth seeded teams in each conference hosted the first round matches. The top seeds in each conference received a bye to the Conference semifinals.

Eastern Conference

Western Conference

Conference semifinals

Eastern Conference

Western Conference

Conference finals
The higher-seeded teams in each conference hosted the matches.

Eastern Conference

Western Conference

MLS Cup 2022

The highest-ranked team remaining in the overall table (Los Angeles FC) hosted the match.

Top goalscorers

References

2022 Major League Soccer season
MLS Cup Playoffs
MLS Cup Playoffs
MLS Cup Playoffs
MLS Cup Playoffs